Boris of Tver or Boris the Great (ca. 1399–February 10, 1461) was a Grand Prince of Tver from April 22, 1426 to his death.

Biography

Domestic and foreign politics 
The year 1425 was devastating for the Principality of Tver. After the sudden death of Vasily I of Moscow, in the same year plague killed three Grand Dukes of Tver: Ivan Mikhailovich, Boris' father Aleksander Ivanovich and brother Jury Aleksandrovich. Thus Boris Aleksandrovich became the ruler of the principality.

At the beginning of his reign the muscovite Grand Prince Vasily II was very young, so the power was concentrated in hands of his warden Vytautas. That was the last chance for Tver to prevent Moscow from complete dominance. In 1427 Boris I came to service of Vytautas together with Ivan III of Ryazan, still staying the ruler of Tver. However, in 1430 Vytautas died and the Grand Duchy of Lithuania immensed in the internal strife. Meanwhile in Rus' started the Muscovite Civil War, that weakened the Moscow princes and let the Principality of Tver more independence.

In 1454 with the death of Dmitry Shemyaka the war was ended, and both Boris I and Ivan III of Ryazan swore their allegiance to Moscow. To tie this alliance, in 1454 Boris married his daughter Maria to Ivan, the future Grand Prince of Moscow. With the help of Saint Jonah, Boris promised Vasily to always support their children and Moscow's interests.

During his reign, the story of Third Rome ("the second Constantinople") started in Tver, when the monk Foma (Thomas) of Tver had written The Eulogy of the Pious Grand Prince Boris Alexandrovich in 1453.

The Kremlin Armoury keeps one of the Boris's hunting artefacts - the Bear spear.

Marriages and family

He first married to Anastasia Andreevna of Mozhaysk, Dmitry Donskoy granddaughter. They had a daughter Maria of Tver (future wife of Ivan III of Moscow).

The second marriage was to Anastasia Alexandrovna of Suzdal, daughter of Aleksander Vasilyevich Shuysky. She gave Boris two sons - Mikhail III of Tver and Alexander (died between 1454-1455). In 1485 she tried to hide Mikhail's treasury and sentenced to exile in Pereslavl-Zalessky.

References

1400 births
1461 deaths
Princes of Tver
Rurik dynasty
Yurievichi family